Borgo Capanne is a village which is part of the municipality of Alto Reno Terme in the province of Bologna in Italy. The village is located at an altitude of 615 m.

References 

Cities and towns in Emilia-Romagna